Heydareh-ye Dar-e Emam (also Romanized as Ḩeydareh-ye Dār-e Emām; also known as Heydareh, Ḩeydareh Ghāzī Khān, and Ḩeydareh-ye Ghāẕī Khān) is a village in Simineh Rud Rural District, in the Central District of Bahar County, Hamedan Province, Iran. At the 2006 census, its population was 667, in 179 families.

References 

Populated places in Bahar County